Hart Glacier, is a glacier in northwestern Greenland. Administratively it belongs to the Avannaata municipality.

This glacier was named by Robert Peary after Gavin W. Hart (1848 – 1909), permanent Councillor and member of the Finance committee of the  Philadelphia Academy of Natural Sciences, who helped Peary raise funds for his expeditions.

Geography 
The Hart Glacier discharges from the Greenland Ice Sheet and has its terminus in the northern side of the head of the Inglefield Fjord, northwest of Josephine Peary Island. Its last stretch lies between Prudhoe Land in the west and Mount Endicott, a nunatak that separates it from the Sharp Glacier to the east. 

The Hart Glacier flows roughly from NW to SE.

See also
List of glaciers in Greenland
Inglefield Fjord

References

External links
Identifying Spatial Variability in Greenland's Outlet Glacier Response to Ocean Heat
Ice front and flow speed variations of marine-terminating outlet glaciers along the coast of Prudhoe Land, northwestern Greenland
 Iceberg in front of 'Hart Glacier'. Inglefield Bredening. Northwest Greenland.
Glaciers of Greenland